SS Braemar Castle was a passenger-cargo steamship, built for Castle Line in 1898, that spent more of her time in British government service than working for her owners. She served both as a troopship and as a hospital ship, prefixed HMT and HMHS respectively, before, during and after the First World War.

She was built in 1898 and originally served as a passenger liner with the Union-Castle Line, sailing from Southampton to South Africa. At the start of the Second Boer War, and from 1909, she served as a troopship and was requisitioned for the British Expeditionary Force in 1914 and in Gallipoli in 1915. Later in 1915, she was converted to a hospital ship, hitting a mine (laid by ) in the Aegean Sea on 23 November 1916 and being repaired at La Spezia.  She continued to serve as a hospital ship, sailing to Murmansk in 1918 and staying until 1920, the last non-Russian ship to leave Archangel. After a brief return to commercial service, Braemar Castle was again requisitioned as a troopship for the peace-keeping force during the Greco-Turkish War. She was sold for demolition in Italy in 1924.

See also
List of hospitals and hospital ships of the Royal Navy
List of hospital ships sunk in World War I

Bibliography 
Notes

References 

Ships of the Union-Castle Line
1898 ships
Hospital ships in World War I
Troop ships of the Royal Navy